Bhendi Fry (alternately called Okra fry, Bhindi fry, Bhindi masala or Bharwan bhindi) is stir fried okra (ladies' finger) that is slit and stuffed with spice mix such as garam masala and other locally available ground spices.

This dish is stir-fried or sautéed slightly, which is distinct from batter-fried okra, which involves deep frying.

It can be served as a side dish in accompaniment with steamed rice and dal or with chapati as a form of sabzi.

See also
 List of Indian dishes
 List of stuffed dishes

References

External links
 Stuffed bhindi recipe
 Bharwan bhindi
 Batter-fried bhindi or okra
 Calories in Bhindi Fry

Indian cuisine
Nepalese cuisine
Vegetarian dishes of India
Masalas
Okra dishes
Indo-Caribbean cuisine